The KFRC Fantasy Fair and Magic Mountain Music Festival was an event held June 10 and 11, 1967, at the 4,000-seat Sidney B. Cushing Memorial Amphitheatre high on the south face of Mount Tamalpais in Marin County, California. Although 20,000 tickets were reported to have been sold for the event, as many as 40,000 people may have actually attended the two-day concert, which was the first of a series of San Francisco–area cultural events known as the Summer of Love. The Fantasy Fair was influenced by the popular Renaissance Pleasure Faire and became a prototype for large scale multi-act outdoor rock music events now known as rock festivals.

Description

The organizers chartered school buses to shuttle attendees and musicians up the mountain from Mill Valley, as Panoramic Highway had been closed to traffic. Those who missed the bus could catch a ride on the back of one of the Hells Angels’ Harleys. Admission to the festival was $2.00 and all proceeds were donated to the nearby Hunters Point Child Care Center in San Francisco. The Fantasy Fair was originally scheduled for June 3 and 4 as a benefit for the center, but was delayed one week by inclement weather. Several acts booked for the original dates were unable to perform.

KFRC 610, the RKO Bill Drake "Boss Radio" Top 40 AM station in San Francisco, had significant influence in the music industry among both counterculture and commercial acts. This enabled festival organizer Tom Rounds, KFRC's program director, to present a colorful and eclectic line-up of popular musicians from both in and outside the region. Canned Heat, Dionne Warwick, Every Mother's Son, The Merry-Go-Round, The Mojo Men, P. F. Sloan, The Seeds, Country Joe and the Fish, Captain Beefheart, The Byrds with Hugh Masekela on trumpet, Tim Buckley, The Sparrows, The Grass Roots, The Loading Zone, The 5th Dimension and Jefferson Airplane were among the performers who appeared. The Fantasy Fair was also The Doors' first large show and happened during the rise of the group's first major hit, "Light My Fire",  to the top of the charts.

Among posters created for the event was one designed by artist Stanley Mouse, then gaining acclaim for poster-art created for Bill Graham, the Fillmore Auditorium and Grateful Dead.

"we did this bus thing where we parked everybody down in Marin County in various parking lots and bussed them up the mountain."- Mel Lawrence (Fantasy Fair co-producer, later, Woodstock's operations manager)

"There were school buses going up and down the mountainside. There's nothing like driving down the center line on a motorcycle with a bus going one way and a bus going the other way and a foot of clearance on either side."- Barry "The Fish" Melton (Country Joe and the Fish)

"I had my guitar in my hand and there was no way to drive up to the stage. So I'm walking and walking and going, "If I planned on going on a hike, I probably would've worn different shoes." I walked all the way up."- Jorma Kaukonen (Jefferson Airplane)

After waiting hours for a ride up the mountain from embarkation points at the Marin County Civic Center, Mill Valley and other locations, attendees were greeted by a giant Buddha balloon when they arrived at the amphitheater. Transportation was provided by the tongue-in-cheek-named "Trans-Love Bus Lines", a variation of the line "Fly Trans Love Airways, get you there on time" from the lyrics to Donovan's song "Fat Angel". Performances were on a main stage and a smaller second stage. Various art-fair type vendors sold posters, crafts and refreshments from booths scattered in the woods around the amphitheater. The festival included a large geodesic dome of pipes and fittings covered with black plastic that contained a light and sound show.

The Magic Mountain Music Festival was favorably reviewed for safety in contemporary press accounts. Fights or disturbances were not an issue, and at the end of the day, trash was placed in or next to the garbage cans provided, and the crowd left Mount Tamalpais as they had found it.

Significance
Reminiscent of their role at the Human Be-In the previous January in Golden Gate Park, members of the Hells Angels motorcycle club pitched in peacefully to help find lost children and to ferry musicians and others up and down the mountain's winding road. While they were not officially hired by organizers, the group also acted as de facto security for the event.

To some commentators, the festival represented a sea change in musical preferences among young Bay Area radio listeners as the hippie culture fully arose in mid-1967. Alec Palao and Jud Cost chronicled the San Francisco mid-sixties era music scene in 1991 in their magazine Cream Puff War #1. Writing about the weeks surrounding the Fantasy Fair, Cost noted that "the dichotomy in Bay Area music was never so evident, as the self-proclaimed "adult" scene separated itself from the "teen/pop" scenes." Scram Magazine juxtaposed that view with pioneer rock magazine editor Greg Shaw's recollection that the rift between the tastes of teens and adults didn't form until later, after the freeform radio style then being established by Tom Donahue fully emerged in the fall of 1967. A review of the bands that played indicates that most were groups that played the Fillmore and Avalon ballrooms and were part of the psychedelic rock scene at the time.

While the highly documented Monterey International Pop Festival continues to be remembered as the seminal event of the 1967 Summer of Love, the KFRC Festival took place one week before Monterey and is considered to have been America's - if not the world's - first rock festival.

Performances

Saturday, June 10
The Charlatans
Mount Rushmore
Rodger Collins
Dionne Warwick
The Doors
The Lamp of Childhood
Canned Heat
Jim Kweskin Jug Band
Spanky and Our Gang
Blackburn & Snow
The Sparrows
Every Mother's Son
Kaleidoscope
The Chocolate Watchband
The Mojo Men
The Merry-Go-Round

Sunday, June 11
Jefferson Airplane
The Byrds w/ Hugh Masekela
P. F. Sloan
Captain Beefheart & the Magic Band
The Seeds
The Grass Roots
The Loading Zone
Tim Buckley
Every Mother's Son
Steve Miller Blues Band
Country Joe and the Fish
Sons of Champlin
The 5th Dimension
The Lamp of Childhood
The Mystery Trend
Penny Nichols
The Merry-Go-Round
New Salvation Army Band

See also

List of historic rock festivals

References

External links
Chronology of San Francisco Rock 1965-1969
Captain Beefheart performance and venue slide show
First U.S. Rock Festival, by Jason Newman. Rolling Stone, June 17, 2014

Folk festivals in the United States
Festivals in the San Francisco Bay Area
1967 in California
Hippie movement
Mount Tamalpais
Rock festivals in the United States
History of the San Francisco Bay Area
History of Marin County, California
Music festivals established in 1967
Music of the San Francisco Bay Area
1967 in the United States
1967 music festivals